The 1963 Saint John's Johnnies football team was an American football team that compiled a perfect 10–0 record and won the NAIA Football National Championship with a victory over Prairie View A&M in the Camellia Bowl. It was the first of four national championships for the Saint John's Johnnies football program under head coach John Gagliardi.

Schedule

Season overview
The team represented Saint John's University as a member of the Minnesota Intercollegiate Athletic Conference (MIAC) during the 1963 NAIA football season. In their 11th season under head coach John Gagliardi, the Johnnies compiled a 10–0 record (7–0 against conference opponents), won the MIAC championship, and outscored opponents by a total of 335 to 72. 

The 1962 Saint John's team had also been unbeaten and untied but did not receive one of the four berths in the NAIA playoffs. Having strung together consecutive perfect seasons, the 1963 team was invited to the playoffs. 

On defense, the team set a national record by giving up an average of only 12.9 rushing yards per game.

Semifinal against Emporia
In their first playoff game, the Johnnies faced undefeated  which featured the NAIA's most potent offense with an average of 517.3 yards per game. Saint John's smothered Emporia's highly-touted offense and won by a 54–0 score. Saint John's scored its 54 points in the first three quarters, intercepted four Emporia passes, recovered two fumbles, and blocked a punt.

Camellia Bowl
On December 7, 1963, the Johnnies faced Prairie View A&M in the Camellia Bowl, the NAIA national championship game played in Sacramento, California. Prairie View, which featured future NFL stars Ken Houston and Otis Taylor, came into the game as the undefeated black college national champion. Three months after the March on Washington and two weeks after the assassination of John F. Kennedy, the Camellia Bowl matched the all-black Prairie View Panthers against the all-white Saint John's Johnnies.  The Johnnies trailed at halftime, but moved ahead with two third-quarter touchdowns and won by a 33–27 score. The victory extended Saint John's winning streak to 19 games. It also brought an NAIA Football National Championship to Saint Johns.

Awards and honors
Coach Gagliardi was selected by the United Press International (UPI) as the MIAC Coach of the Year. He was also named small college coach of the year by the Rockne Club of America.  The 1963 team won the first of four national championships earned by Gagliardi's teams at Saint John's. Gagliardi's teams also won national championships in 1965, 1976, and 2003. Gagliardi became the winningest coach in college football history and was inducted into the College Football Hall of Fame.

Halfback Bernie Beckman was named MIAC Player of the Year, as voted by the MIAC coaches for the UPI.

Saint John's dominated the 1963 All-MIAC football team selected by the conference coaches, filling 12 of 22 spots: Craig Muyres (named as quarterback on offensive team and safety on defensive team); halfback Bernie Beckman (named to the offensive and defensive teams); halfback Bob Spinner; fullback Rich Froehle; end Ken Roering (named to the offensive and defensive teams); tackle John McDowell (named to the offensive and defensive teams); offensive guard Dave Honer; and defensive end Hardy Reyerson.

The 1963 team was inducted into Saint John's J-Club Hall of Honor in 2019.

References

Saint John's
Saint John's Johnnies football seasons
NAIA Football National Champions
Minnesota Intercollegiate Athletic Conference football champion seasons
Saint John's Johnnies football
College football undefeated seasons